The Autoroute Casablanca–Safi is an expressway in Morocco. 

Casablanca–El Jadida 
Works began on the Casablanca-El Jadida part of the project (112.5 km) in 2003 and finished in 2006.
 2004: Bypass of Casablanca city (33.5 km);
 2005: Casablanca-Tnine Chtouka (51 km);
 2006: Tnine Chtouka-El Jadida (28 km).

El Jadida–Safi 
The 143-km extension from El Jadida south to Safi opened on 4 August 2016.

References

Expressway, Safi
Expressway, Safi
A1